FK Železničar (Serbian Cyrillic: ФК Железничар) is a Serbian football club based in Belgrade.

History
FK Železničar was formed in 1924, when a group of workers from the Belgrade railway station began playing the game. Later that year, the first team was formed. In the 1927–28 season the club started to compete and, by the end of their first season, they finished fifth. The club had many problems with their financial status but they continued to play. In 1935, FK Železničar built a new stadium. In the opening match they crushed FK Građanski, from Zemun, 12–0, in a memorable match for the fans. The club stayed in the same league until the Second World War.

During the war, all games had been cut but, after it ended, the sport association of Železničar began to form new sport societies. The team began to compete in higher leagues. In the early 1950s, they competed in the "Unified Sport League" (Jedinstvena sportska Liga). Later they moved on to the First League of Belgrade. In the 1989 season, the club was promoted to the Belgrade Zone, at that time the highest competition in Belgrade.

In 1995 it becomes member of the Serbian League Belgrade, however its major success was achieved in 1999 when it gained promotion into the FR Yugoslav Second League – group North, where it stayed until 2003, when it was relegated by administrative decision because of the restructuring of the league competition system.

Former coaches
Important coaches in club history:
Mikica Arsenijević
Rajko Mitić
Miroljub Čolović
Božidar Milenković
Tomislav Savić
Goran Kalušević

References

External links
 FK Železničar official website 
 Club profile and squad at Srbijafudbal

Football clubs in Serbia
Football clubs in Belgrade
1924 establishments in Serbia
Beograd
Savski Venac